Sclater's tyrannulet (Phyllomyias sclateri) is a species of bird in the family Tyrannidae. It is found in Argentina, Bolivia, and Peru. Its natural habitats are subtropical or tropical moist montane forests and heavily degraded former forest.

The common name and the Latin binomial commemorate the British zoologist Philip Lutley Sclater.

References

Sclater's tyrannulet
Birds of the Yungas
Sclater's tyrannulet
Taxonomy articles created by Polbot